Misheck Chaila (born 13 November 1990) is a Zambian footballer who plays as a midfielder for Nkana F.C. and the Zambia national football team.

Career

Club
In November 2020, Chaila moved to Nkana F.C., leaving ZESCO United.

References

External links

1990 births
Living people
Zambian footballers
Zambia international footballers
Association football midfielders
Konkola Blades F.C. players
ZESCO United F.C. players
Nkana F.C. players
Sportspeople from Lusaka